Özcan Yaşar (born 13 January 2002) is a professional footballer who plays as a forward for Eerste Divisie club VVV-Venlo. Born in the Netherlands, he represents Turkey internationally.

Club career

Early years
Yaşar played youth football for SV De Vecht and Elinkwijk, before joining the Utrecht youth academy in 2015. He made his debut for the reserve team Jong Utrecht in the Eerste Divisie on 10 January 2020, replacing Jeredy Hilterman in the 79th minute of a 2–1 away loss.

In the summer of 2021, he moved to NAC Breda, where he was assigned to the under-21 squad.

VVV-Venlo
On 16 July 2022, Yaşar signed a one-year contract with VVV-Venlo with an option for an additional year, after a successful trial. The move reunited him with former Utrecht coach Rick Kruys.

Yaşar made his debut for VVV on the first matchday of the 2022–23 Eerste Divisie season, replacing Sven Braken in the 75th minute of a 3–0 home win over Almere City.

Career statistics

References

External links
 

2002 births
People from Stichtse Vecht
Footballers from Utrecht (province)
Living people
Dutch people of Turkish descent
Turkish footballers
Turkey youth international footballers
Dutch footballers
Association football forwards
USV Elinkwijk players
FC Utrecht players
Jong FC Utrecht players
NAC Breda players
VVV-Venlo players
Eerste Divisie players